Édouard Glissant (21 September 1928 – 3 February 2011) was a French writer, poet, philosopher, and literary critic from Martinique. He is widely recognised as one of the most influential figures in Caribbean thought and cultural commentary and Francophone literature.

Life
Édouard Glissant was born in Sainte-Marie, Martinique. He studied at the Lycée Schœlcher, named after the abolitionist Victor Schœlcher, where the poet Aimé Césaire had studied and to which he returned as a teacher. Césaire had met Léon Damas there; later in Paris, France, they would join with Léopold Senghor, a poet and the future first president of Senegal, to formulate and promote the concept of negritude. Césaire did not teach Glissant, but did serve as an inspiration to him (although Glissant sharply criticized many aspects of his philosophy); another student at the school at that time was Frantz Fanon.

Glissant left Martinique in 1946 for Paris, where he received his PhD, having studied ethnography at the Musée de l'Homme and  History and philosophy at the Sorbonne. He established, with Paul Niger, the separatist Front Antillo-Guyanais pour l'Autonomie party in 1959, as a result of which Charles de Gaulle barred him from leaving France between 1961 and 1965. He returned to Martinique in 1965 and founded the Institut martiniquais d'études, as well as Acoma, a social sciences publication. Glissant divided his time among Martinique, Paris and New York; since 1995, he was Distinguished Professor of French at the CUNY Graduate Center. Before his tenure at CUNY Graduate Center, he was a professor at Louisiana State University in the Department of French and Francophone Studies from 1988 to 1993.  In January 2006, Glissant was asked by Jacques Chirac to take on the presidency of a new cultural centre devoted to the history of slave trade.

Writings
Shortlisted for the Nobel Prize in 1992, when Derek Walcott emerged as the recipient, Glissant was the pre-eminent critic of the Négritude school of Caribbean writing and father-figure for the subsequent Créolité group of writers that includes Patrick Chamoiseau and Raphaël Confiant. While Glissant's first novel portrays the political climate in 1940s Martinique, through the story of a group of young revolutionaries, his subsequent work focuses on questions of language, identity, space, history, and knowledge and knowledge production.

For example, in his text Poetics of Relation, Glissant explores the concept of opacity, which is the lack of transparency, the untransability, the unknowability. And for this reason, opacity has the radical potentiality for social movements to challenge and subvert systems of domination. Glissant demands the "right to opacity," indicating the oppressed—which have historically been constructed as the Other—can and should be allowed to be opaque, to not be completely understood, and to simply exist as different. The colonizer perceived the colonized as different and unable to be understood, thereby constructing the latter as the Other and demanding transparency so that the former could somehow fit them into their cognitive schema and so that they could dominate them. However, Glissant rejects this transparency and defends opacity and difference because other modes of understanding do exist. That is, Glissant calls for understanding and accepting difference without measuring that difference to an "ideal scale" and comparing and making judgements, "without creating a hierarchy"—as Western thought has done.

Poetics of Relation: "The Open Boat" 
In the excerpt from Poetics of Relation, "The Open Boat", Glissant's imagery was particularly compelling when describing the slave experience and the linkage between a slave and the homeland and the slave and the unknown.  This poem paralleled Dionne Brand's book in calling the "Door of No Return" an Infinite Abyss.  This image conveys emptiness sparked by unknown identity as it feels deep and endless.  "The Open Boat" also discussed the phenomenon of "falling into the belly of the whale" which elicits many references and meanings.  This image parallels the Biblical story of Jonah and the Whale, realizing the gravity of biblical references as the Bible was used as justification for slavery.  More literally, Glissant related the boat to a whale as it "devoured your existence".  As each word a poet chooses is specifically chosen to aid in furthering the meaning of the poem,  the word "Falling" implies an unintentional and undesirable action.  This lends to the experience of the slaves on the ship as they were confined to an overcrowded, filthy, and diseased existence among other slaves, all there against their will.  All of Glissant's primary images in this poem elicit the feeling of endlessness, misfortune, and ambiguity, which were arguably the future existence of the slaves on ships to "unknown land".

Slave ships did not prioritize the preservation of cultural or individual history or roots, but rather only documented the exchange rates for the individuals on the ship, rendering slaves mere possessions and their histories part of the abyss.  This poem also highlights an arguable communal feeling through shared relationship to the abyss of personal identity.  As the boat is the vessel that permits the transport of known to unknown, all share the loss of sense of self with one another.  The poem also depicts the worthlessness of slaves as they were expelled from their "womb" when they no longer required "protection" or transport from within it.  Upon losing exchange value, slaves were expelled overboard, into the abyss of the sea, into another unknown, far from their origins or known land.

This "relation" that Glissant discusses through his critical work conveys a "shared knowledge".  Referring back to the purpose of slaves—means of monetary and property exchange—Glissant asserts that the primary exchange value is in the ability to transport knowledge from one space or person to another—to establish a connection between what is known and unknown.

Glissant's development of the notion of antillanité seeks to root Caribbean identity firmly within "the Other America" and springs from a critique of identity in previous schools of writing, specifically the work of Aimé Césaire, which looked to Africa for its principal source of identification. Glissant is notable for his attempt to trace parallels between the history and culture of the Creole Caribbean and those of Latin America and the plantation culture of the American South, most obviously in his study of William Faulkner. Generally speaking, Glissant's thinking seeks to interrogate notions of centre, origin and linearity, embodied in his distinction between atavistic and composite cultures, which has influenced subsequent Martinican writers' trumpeting of hybridity as the bedrock of Caribbean identity and their "creolised" approach to textuality. As such, he is both a key (though underrated) figure in postcolonial literature and criticism, but also he often pointed out that he was close to two French philosophers, Félix Guattari and Gilles Deleuze, and their theory of the rhizome.

Glissant died in Paris, France, on 3 February 2011, at the age of 82.

Bibliography

Essays 
Soleil de la conscience (Poétique I) (1956; Paris: Éditions Gallimard, 1997). Sun of Consciousness, trans. Nathanaël (New York: Nightboat Books, 2020).
L'Intention poétique (Poétique II) (1969; Paris: Gallimard, 1997). Poetic Intention, trans. Nathalie Stephens (New York: Nightboat Books, 2010).
Le Discours antillais (Éditions du Seuil, 1981; Paris: Gallimard, 1997). Caribbean Discourse: Selected Essays, trans. Michael Dash (University Press of Virginia, 1989; 1992).
Poétique de la relation (Poétique III) (Paris: Gallimard, 1990). Poetics of Relation, trans. Betsy Wing (University of Michigan Press, 1997).
Discours de Glendon (Éditions du GREF, 1990). Includes bibliography by Alain Baudot.
Introduction à une poétique du divers (1995; Paris: Gallimard, 1996). Introduction to a Poetics of Diversity, trans. Celia Britton (Liverpool University Press, 2020).
Faulkner, Mississippi (Paris: Stock, 1996; Gallimard, 1998). Trans. Barbara Lewis and Thomas C. Spear (Farrar Straus Giroux, 1999; University of Chicago Press, 2000).
Racisme blanc (Paris: Gallimard, 1998).
Traité du tout-monde (Poétique IV) (Paris: Gallimard, 1997). Treatise on the Whole-World, trans. Celia Britton (Liverpool University Press, 2020).
La Cohée du Lamentin (Poétique V) (Paris: Gallimard, 2005).
Ethnicité d'aujourd'hui (Paris: Gallimard, 2005).
Une nouvelle région du monde (Esthétique I) (Paris: Gallimard, 2006).
Mémoires des esclavages (Paris: Gallimard, 2007). With an introduction by Dominique de Villepin.
Quand les murs tombent. L'identité nationale hors-la-loi? (Paris: Galaade Editions, 2007). With Patrick Chamoiseau.
La Terre magnétique: les errances de Rapa Nui, l'île de Pâques (Paris: Seuil, 2007). With Sylvie Séma.
Les Entretiens de Baton Rouge (Paris: Gallimard, 2008). The Baton Rouge Interviews, with Alexandre Leupin. Trans. Katie M. Cooper (Liverpool University Press, 2020).

Poetry 
Un champ d'il̂es (Instance, 1953).
La Terre inquiète (Éditions du Dragon, 1955).
Les Indes (Falaize, 1956). The Indies, trans. Dominique O’Neill (Ed. du GREF, 1992).
Le Sel noir (Seuil, 1960). Black Salt, trans. Betsy Wing (University of Michigan Press, 1999).
Le Sang rivé (Présence africaine, 1961).
Poèmes : un champ d'il̂es, La terre inquiète, Les Indes (Seuil, 1965).
Boises : histoire naturelle d'une aridité (Acoma, 1979).
Le Sel noir; Le Sang rivé; Boises (Gallimard, 1983).
Pays rêvé, pays réel (Seuil, 1985).
Fastes (Ed. du GREF, 1991).
Poèmes complets (Gallimard, 1994). The Collected Poems of Edouard Glissant, trans. Jeff Humpreys (University of Minnesota Press, 2005).
Includes: Le sang rivé; Un champ d'îles; La terre inquiète; Les Indes; Le sel noir; Boises; Pays rêvé, pays réel; Fastes; Les grands chaos.
Le Monde incréé; Conte de ce que fut la Tragédie d'Askia; Parabole d'un Moulin de Martinique; La Folie Célat (Gallimard, 2000).
Poems followed by three texts from 1963, 1975 and 1987.

Novels
La Lézarde (Seuil, 1958; Gallimard, 1997). The Ripening, trans. Frances Frenaye (George Braziller, 1959) and later by Michael Dash (Heinemann, 1985).
Le Quatrième siècle (Seuil, 1964). The Fourth Century, trans. Betsy Wing (University of Michigan Press, 2001).
Malemort (Seuil, 1975; Gallimard, 1997).
La Case du commandeur (Seuil, 1981; Gallimard, 1997). The Overseer's Cabin, trans. Betsy Wing (University of Nebraska Press, 2011).
Mahagony (Seuil, 1987; Gallimard, 1997). Mahagony, trans. Betsy Wing (University of Nebraska Press, 2021).
Tout-monde (Gallimard, 1993).
Sartorius: le roman des Batoutos (Gallimard, 1999).
Ormerod (Gallimard, 2003).

Theatre
Monsieur Toussaint (Seuil, 1961; Gallimard, 1998). Trans. Joseph G. Foster and Barbara A. Franklin (Three Continents Press, 1981) and later by Michael Dash (Lynne Rienner Publishers, 2005).

Interviews with Glissant
1998: "Nous sommes tous des créoles", interview in Regards (January).
1998: "De la poétique de la relation au tout-monde", interview in Atalaia.
1998: "Penser l’abolition", Le Monde (24 April)
1998: "L’Europe et les Antilles", interview in Mots Pluriels, No. 8 (October)
1998: interview in Le Pelletier, C. (ed.), Encre noire - la langue en liberté, Guadeloupe-Guyane-Martinique: Ibis Rouge.
2000: "La «créolisation» culturelle du monde", interview in Label France [BROKEN LINK]
2010: "Édouard Glissant: one world in relation", film by Manthia Diawara

Writings on Glissant

Book-length studies

Dash, M. (1995): Edouard Glissant, Cambridge: Cambridge University Press.
Britton, C. (1999): Glissant and Postcolonial Theory; Strategies of Language and Resistance , Charlottesville, VA: University Press of Virginia.
Drabinski, J., and Marisa Parham, eds. (2015). Theorizing Glissant: Sites and Citations. London: Rowman and Littlefield.
Uwe, C. (2017): Le Discours choral: essai sur l'oeuvre romanesque d'Édouard Glissant, Bruxelles: Peter Lang.

Articles
Britton, C. (1994): "Discours and histoire, magical and political discourse in Edouard Glissant's Le quatrième siècle", French Cultural Studies, 5: 151–162.
Britton, C. (1995): "Opacity and transparency: conceptions of history and cultural difference in the work of Michel Butor and Edouard Glissant", French Studies, 49: 308–320.
Britton, C. (1996): "'A certain linguistic homelessness: relations to language in Edouard Glissant's Malemort", Modern Language Review, 91: 597–609.
Britton, C. (2000): "Fictions of identity and identities of fiction in Glissant's Tout-monde", ASCALF Year Book, 4: 47–59.
Dalleo, R. (2004): "Another 'Our America': Rooting a Caribbean Aesthetic in the Work of José Martí, Kamau Brathwaite and Édouard Glissant", Anthurium, 2.2.
Dorschel, A. (2005): "Nicht-System und All-Welt", Süddeutsche Zeitung 278 (2 December 2005), 18 (in German).
Oakley, S. (2008): "Commonplaces: Rhetorical Figures of Difference in Heidegger and Glissant", Philosophy & Rhetoric 41.1: 1–21.

Conference proceedings
Delpech, C., and M. Rœlens (eds). 1997: Société et littérature antillaises aujourd'hui, Perpignan: Presses Universitaires de Perpignan.

Academic theses
Nick Coates. Gardens in the sands: the notion of space in recent critical theory and contemporary writing from the French Antilles (UCL: 2001) Coates devotes a chapter to Glissant's later fiction (Mahagony, Tout-monde, Sartorius), while the thesis is heavily indebted to Glissant's writings on space and chaos in particular in thinking about post-colonial treatments of space more widely.
Schwieger Hiepko, Andrea (2009): "Rhythm 'n' Creole. Antonio Benítez Rojo und Edouard Glissant – Postkoloniale Poetiken der kulturellen Globalisierung".
 Kuhn, Helke (2013): Rhizome, Verzweigungen, Fraktale: Vernetztes Schreiben und Komponieren im Werk von Édouard Glissant. Berlin: Weidler,  .

See also 

 Caribbean poetry
 Caribbean literature
 Postcolonial literature

References

External links
 The Library of Glissant Studies
 Ile en Ile Glissant Profile (in  French)
 Loïc Céry's Glissant page
 A Plea for "Products of High Necessity" (manifesto)
 
 The literary papers of Édouard Glissant, Fonds Édouard Glissant, are held at the Bibliothèque nationale de France, Archives and Manuscripts, Paris.

1928 births
2011 deaths
People from Sainte-Marie, Martinique
20th-century French novelists
20th-century French poets
21st-century French novelists
21st-century French poets
21st-century French male writers
French literary critics
Martiniquais writers
French people of Martiniquais descent
French male poets
French male novelists
20th-century French male writers
University of Paris alumni
Graduate Center, CUNY faculty
Prix Renaudot winners
Prix Roger Caillois recipients
French male non-fiction writers